The Real Thing is the eighth studio album by American singer Vanessa Williams. It was released by Concord Records on June 2, 2009 in the United States. The album features productions by Keith Thomas, Kenneth "Babyface" Edmonds, Rob Mathes, and Rex Rideout. The Real Thing peaked at number 91 on the US Billboard 200. It also reached number one on the Top Contemporary Jazz Albums chart, number two on the Top Jazz Albums chart, and number 36 on the Top R&B/Hip-Hop Albums chart.

Background and composition
The Real Thing was originally intended to be a "Brazilian-type" record. However, when Williams contacted Babyface for the album production, it was revealed the album would have a more R&B sound. She considered the album a combination of different influences, such as classical, jazz, and Latin music. The Real Thing was also produced by Keith Thomas, Rob Mathes and Rex Rideout, and features songs written by Stevie Wonder, Bill Withers, Bebel Gilberto, Phil Galdston, and Babyface. When asked about the album style, Williams said:

"Yes, for me this is kind of a reflective record. [...] You know, I'm in my mid-forties; I've been divorced twice; I've raised four children; I'm a career woman... So it is a kind of look at love from all those different female perspectives. [...] 'The Real Thing' represents the promise of being back with a lover; 'October Sky' is a break-up song… Plus, with me being an actor who's also a singer, my favourite songs to sing are always those that tell a story. Because, when I go into the studio, I do kind of approach everything as an actor. [...] So, in that way, I do think all the songs on 'The Real Thing' either have some deep storyline, or can give an effect of a character at a particular time in a particular place."

Singles
"Breathless" was released as the lead single from the album on February 24, 2009. It failed to chart, but Williams has stated that it is one of her favorite songs on the album.
"Just Friends" was released as the second single on May 19, 2009. It reached #10 on the Billboard Jazz Songs chart.
"Close to You" was released as the third worldwide single on August 11, 2009. The single also failed to chart.
"The Real Thing" was released as the fourth single on September 28, 2009. It was written by Stevie Wonder and was released with a Soul Seekerz dance remix.

Critical reception

AllMusic editor Andy Kellman found that the album "carries a relaxed, serene feel, even when it is at its most active and spirited. The highlights tend to come with the Latin material [...] which Williams pulls off with natural ease. It's not likely to raise anyone's body temperature, but it's too welcoming to ignore." Slant Magazine's Jonathan Keefe described The Real Thing as "unfashionable, irrelevant material. With the moment for albums of pop standards from veteran artists like Rod Stewart, Michael McDonald, and Cyndi Lauper having passed, and with crooners like Michael Bublé and Norah Jones no longer selling as well as they once did, it's impossible to imagine that there’s a market for Real Thing."

Chart performance
The Real Thing debuted and peaked at number 91 on the US Billboard 200. By May 2010, the album had sold 62,000 copies in United States.

Track listing

Notes
 signifies associate producer(s)

Charts

Weekly charts

Year-end charts

References

2009 albums
Concord Records albums
Vanessa Williams albums
Albums produced by Rob Mathes